The China Ordnance Equipment Group Corporation, also known as China South Industries Group Corporation (CSGC), is a Chinese state-owned manufacturer of automobiles, motorcycles, firearms, vehicle components, and optical-electronic products and other special products domestically and internationally. The company was founded in 1999 and is based in Haidian District, Beijing. CSGC is the parent company of Changan Automobile.

In November 2020, Donald Trump issued an executive order prohibiting any American company or individual from owning shares in companies that the United States Department of Defense has listed as having links to the People's Liberation Army, which included China South Industries Group Corporation.

References

External links
 
 

Defence companies of the People's Republic of China
Manufacturing companies based in Beijing
Government-owned companies of China
Chinese companies established in 1999
Chinese brands
Firearm manufacturers of China